The 1951 Syracuse Grand Prix was a non-championship Formula One motor race held in Syracuse, Sicily on 11 March 1951.

Classification

Race

References

Syracuse Grand Prix
Syracuse
Syracuse Grand Prix
Syracuse Grand Prix